Jung Joon (born March 6, 1979) is a South Korean actor. Though primarily a supporting actor, he played the leading role in the 2001 television drama Delicious Proposal and the 2006 film Blue Sky. In 2013, Jung and real-life friends Yang Dong-geun and Kim Yoo-mi starred in the documentary Black Gospel, in which they joined Korean gospel group Heritage on a month-long trip to Harlem to discover and experience the roots of gospel music.

Filmography

Television series

Film

Variety show

References

External links
 Jung Joon Fan Cafe at Daum 
 
 
 

1979 births
Living people
South Korean male film actors
South Korean male television actors
South Korean male child actors
People from Goyang